Monoptilon bellioides, the desert star, also called Mojave desertstar, is a desert flowering plant in the family Asteraceae.

Distribution
It is native to stony and sandy plains in the Mojave Desert of California and the Sonoran Deserts of the Southwestern United States northwestern Mexico.

Description
Monoptilon bellioides is a short annual plant; in seasons with very little rainfall, the plant may only grow to 1–2 cm, if it grows at all, while in seasons of heavy rainfall, it can grow up to 25 cm tall. The leaves are linear, 5–10 mm long, with a blunt apex.

The flowers are produced in dense inflorescences (capitula), 2 cm diameter, with white ray florets and yellow disc florets in the center. The flowers open in the morning and close in the evening.

References

Mojave Desert Wildflowers, Jon Mark Stewart, 1998, pg. 41
The Audubon Society Field Guide to North American Wildflowers, Western Region, 1992, pg. 380.

External links
Calflora Database: Monoptilon bellioides (Mojave desert star)
Jepson eFlora (TJM2) treatment of Monoptilon bellioides
USDA Plants Profile for Monoptilon bellioides (Mojave desertstar)
 UC CalPhotos gallery of Monoptilon bellioides

Astereae
Flora of the California desert regions
Flora of Arizona
Flora of Nevada
Flora of Northwestern Mexico
Flora of the Sonoran Deserts
Natural history of the Colorado Desert
Natural history of the Mojave Desert
Flora without expected TNC conservation status